Farhad Azima (born in 1941) is an American airline operator. He has flown weapons to the Balkans and navigated Washington's power circles.

Career
In 1981, Azima  founded Global International Airways, a charter and cargo carrier. He is  the owner of the  Kansas City-based Aviation Leasing Group and  HeavyLift International. For many years Azima has been involved in arms shipments. His company’s planes have flown weapons to Pakistan to supply Islamists fighting the Soviet occupation of Afghanistan; to Egypt following the Camp David Accords of 1978 and to Croatia during the war for independence from Yugoslavia.

An Azima aircraft is alleged to have smuggled weapons into Iran as part of the Iran–Contra affair, a secret scheme used by the US to fund anti-Communist rebels in Nicaragua. Azima denies any involvement.

Azima has done extensive business in the Middle East. In 2011 he facilitated a deal for the Emirate of Ras al Khaimah to sell the Sheraton Metechi Hotel in Tbisli, Georgia  to Houshang Hosseinpour, Pourya Nayebi and Houshang Farsoudeh, three Iranians who were later placed on the US sanctions list. Azima was to receive a 10%  commission and Khater Massaad a $500,000 payment. Azima was later cited as key source of information for former Wall Street Journal reporter Jay Solomon’s reporting  on the three Iranians’ efforts to evade U.S. sanctions.

Azima owned a private intelligence firm, Denx LLC, that disbanded in 2016.

Azima was also employed for many years by ALG Airlines also known as ALG and has carried out multiple business ventures for over four decades.

Azima is currently in a UK High Court dispute with Ras Al Khaimah Investment Authority (RAKIA) over a financial settlement the Emirate says Azima negotiated fraudulently during the winding up of a joint venture. Azima initially filed suit in the District Court for the District of Columbia seeking damages from the Emirate for the hack, but has since had his case thrown out of the American courts. Azima then filed a similar claim in the UK High Court where the case is ongoing. The judge has so far struck out critical sections of Azima’s claim, ordering him to pay a further £58,000 in court costs, which brings his total to £180,000. Two witness statements supporting Azima have also been struck out.

Awards and recognition
Azima has been recognized by the United States Air Force for his services to America during the build-up to and execution of the Gulf War. He has been honored for his role in economic development, particularly in development of the airline industry. In 1997, he received a Citation for Achievement Award by William Jewell College. In 1988, Azima was awarded the Ellis Island Medal of Honor.

Personal life
Azima is an Iranian-American and moved to the United States at a young age and pursued his higher education in Kansas City. Throughout 40 years of his career in the international arena, Farhad Azima has always supported dozens of students by providing educational expenses and with career opportunities.

References

Arms traders
1941 births
American people of Iranian descent
American businesspeople
Living people